Fang Hui, also called Wanli, Tuanfu, Xugu, and Yangshanren, was a scholar of the late Song and early Yuan dynasties from Huizhou's She county (in present-day Anhui province), who lived from 1227 to 1307. He controversially accepted offices from the invading Yuan dynasty.

References

1227 births
1307 deaths
Song dynasty historians
Song dynasty politicians from Anhui
Yuan dynasty historians
Politicians from Huangshan
Historians from Anhui
13th-century Chinese historians